King Stakh's Wild Hunt is a novel by author Uladzimir Karatkievich published in 1964. It's based on the Wild Hunt - a folklore motif (Motif E501 in Stith Thompson's Motif Index of Folklore) that historically occurs in the folklore of various Northern and Eastern European cultures. Uladzimir Karatkievich outlined this folk legends of Belarus, based on historical events, but with a social background. Ethnographer Andrei Belaretski is not a fictional hero of the novel: he told this story to the author himself at the age of ninety-six.

A 1979 film is based on the novel. Karatkievich did not particularly like this adaptation, since one of the key themes of the story was practically absent in the film - sadness about the plight of the Belarusian people.

Plot 

The story is told on behalf of the main character, Andrej Biełarecki, who is 96 years old at the moment of his narration. The story itself occurred during his youth, in the fall of 1888, somewhere in a remote swampy Belarusian area, when he, a young folklorist, lost his way during a rainstorm and found himself at a family castle of Janoŭskis.

The story takes place at the end of the 19th century. The young scientist, folklorist Andrej Biełarecki, having lost his way during a storm, finds himself in the Janoŭskis' ancestral castle - Bałotnyja Jaliny (Swamp Firs). He is received by the owner of the castle, Nadzieja Janoŭskaja, the last representative of her family. She tells Biełarecki that the Janoŭski family is cursed for twenty generations because of the betrayal committed by her ancestor, Raman the Old, and Nadzieja, a representative of the twentieth generation, expects a quick death, with which the Janoŭski family will end. She talks about the ghosts, the appearance of which heralds her death - the Wild Hunt, the Little Man, the Blue Woman.

Biełarecki remains in the castle to protect Nadzieja and unravel the tangle of events. He sees the Little Man - a small creature with very long fingers, who looks through the windows at night; The Blue Woman, descended from an old portrait, to which Nadzieja is very similar. Gradually, Biełarecki gets to know the rest of the inhabitants and Janoŭskaja's relatives: former student Andrej Sviecilovič, majordomo Ihnaś Bierman-Hacevič, her uncle and guardian Ryhor (Hryń) Dubatoŭk, haughty young gentry Alieś Varona, the hunter and tracker Ryhor. One evening in the swamp he is pursued by the Wild Hunt - a group of silent horsemen who gallop silently, move freely through the bog, make huge jumps and leave traces of ancient horseshoes. Biełarecki miraculously manages to hide in the castle and with renewed energy continues to search for people hiding behind the Wild Hunt. Together with Ryhor, they reveal the secret of the death of Nadzieja's father, driven into a swamp by the Wild Hunt two years before Biełarecki's arrival. Gradually, they reveal the secret of the Wild Hunt - it was organized by Dubatoŭk in order to bring the girl to madness or death and take possession of the castle. All the riders were pursued and killed by local men, and Dubatoŭk died in a quagmire under the hooves of the Wild Hunt. The ghosts of the castle also disappear: the Little Man turns out to be Bierman's feeble-minded brother, whom Bierman let out of secret corridors, and the Blue Woman - to Nadzieja herself, who wanders the castle in a somnambulistic dream.

Biełarecki takes Nadzieja from the Swamp Firs and marries her. Over time, she heals from constant fear and sleepwalking. By the end of the story, she is pregnant.

See also 
 Wild Hunt

External links 
 Glagoslav Publications - King Stakh's Wild Hunt by Uladzimir Karatkevich in English

References

1964 novels
Novels adapted into films
Belarusian books
Belarusian-language literature